
Gmina Wieprz is a rural gmina (administrative district) in Wadowice County, Lesser Poland Voivodeship, in southern Poland.

Villages
Gmina Wieprz contains the villages and settlements of Frydrychowice, Gierałtowice, Gierałtowiczki, Nidek, Przybradz and Wieprz.

Neighbouring gminas
Gmina Wieprz is bordered by the gminas of Andrychów, Kęty, Osiek, Polanka Wielka, Przeciszów, Tomice, Wadowice and Zator.

References
Polish official population figures 2006

Wieprz
Wadowice County